Van Eaton is the surname of the following people
Charles Van Eaton (1889–1974), American politician in Iowa
Henry Smith Van Eaton (1826–1898), American politician in Mississippi
Guy Franklin Van Eaton (1878–1950), Canadian politician in Saskatchewan
Jimmy Van Eaton (born 1937), American drummer and singer
Lon & Derrek Van Eaton, American vocal and multi-instrumentalist duo
T. C. Van Eaton (1862–1951), American politician in Washington State

See also
Eaton (surname)